Manzurul Nabi was an Indian Politician and a Member Of Parliament from Saharanpur (Lok Sabha constituency).  His political party was the Indian National Congress. As a member of 2nd Lok Sabha he was in office from April 1957 to March 1962.

References 

Year of birth missing
Possibly living people
Indian National Congress politicians from Uttar Pradesh